The sixth season of Battle of the Blades premiered on October 22, 2020, on CBC Television featuring eight couples.  The venue of this season was moved to CAA Centre in Brampton, Ontario.

Production
Ron MacLean returns as host, with Canadian singer Keshia Chanté joining as the new co-host. Previous host and judge Kurt Browning is the "Elite Battle Expert" this season acting as a correspondent, and provides colour commentary throughout the series. The judging panel saw a complete overhaul this season, with the additions of Olympic ice dancing gold medalist Scott Moir, Olympic ice hockey gold medalist and season 5 runner-up Natalie Spooner, and Junior Canadian figure skating champion Elladj Baldé. For the first time in the series' history, a record three female ice hockey players and three male figure skaters, were cast as contestants this season, besting the number of two female ice hockey players in season 5.

Because of the ongoing COVID-19 pandemic in Canada, there is no live studio audience for the taping of the season. Instead, viewers were encouraged to sign up to become "virtual audience" members to attend the tapings of the series, and have a livestream video of themselves broadcast via screens placed in the audience sections of the arena, to the effect of having these viewers being in the actual audience inside the arena.

The season premiere date was originally scheduled for October 15, 2020. On October 7, 2020, all training and pre-production was halted, after a member of the production team was tested positive for COVID-19. The season premiere is then postponed and re-scheduled for October 22, 2020.

Ratings
The re-scheduled season premiere on October 22, 2020 was broadcast up against the 2020 United States presidential debate between Donald Trump and Joe Biden.  The debate brought in over 3 million viewers and was the top rated television program of the week.  The Battle of the Blades premiere drew in 455,000 viewers.  For the first time in the history of the series, the season premiere did not place in the Top 30 for the weekly most watched television programs in Canada.

Couples

Scoring Chart
Red numbers indicate the couples with the lowest score for each week.
Green numbers indicate the couples with the highest score for each week.
 indicates the couple(s) eliminated that week.
 indicates the returning couple that finished in the bottom two (*bottom three in week 4) the previous week, but won the Skate-Off.
 indicates the couples in the Skate-Off that were declared safe due to the Skate-Off finishing in a draw.
 indicates the winning couple.
 indicates the runner-up couple.
 indicates the third-place couple.

Average chart

Individual songs & scores
Individual judges scores in charts below (given in parentheses) are listed in this order from left to right unless specified: Natalie Spooner, Elladj Baldé, Scott Moir. The couples are listed in the running order of each episode.

Week 1

Week 2 - Halloween

Week 3 - Personal Motivation

Week 4 - Canadian Music

Week 5 - A Night Out

Week 6 - Finale 
The judges' score from the performance this week combined with the viewer's voting from last week determined the 3rd and 4th placing couples.  The top two couples then advance to the next round and reprised a skating performance from a previous week.  The couple with the higher judges' score from the Reprise Skate wins the competition.

Notes
a ^ Due to the Skate-Off in Week 3 resulting in a scoring tie with no elimination, there was a double elimination in Week 4. The bottom three couples were in the Skate-Off with the lowest scoring two couples of the Skate-Off eliminated.

References

External links
 Official site

Season 06
Battle of the Blades participants